Kopeyka may refer to:
Kopeyka (supermarket)
  or Kopek, 1/100 of a Ruble in Russian currency
 Kopeyka or VAZ-2101, an automobile manufactured from 1970 to 1984, ab bat of some sort